Citricoccus nitrophenolicus is a Gram-positive, para-nitrophenol-degrading and non-motile  bacterium from the genus Citricoccus which has been isolated from sludge from a wastewater treatment plant from Northern Jutland, Denmark.

References

External links
 microbewiki

Bacteria described in 2012
Micrococcaceae